Liam Coyle is the name of:

Liam Coyle (footballer, born 1968), Northern Irish footballer
Liam Coyle (footballer, born 1999), English footballer